The Portuguese Albums Chart ranks the best-performing albums in Portugal, as tracked by the Associação Fonográfica Portuguesa.

References

Portugal
2014 in Portugal
Albums 2014